Bilar, officially the Municipality of Bilar,  is a 4th class municipality in the province of Bohol, Philippines. According to the 2020 census, it has a population of 18,512 people.

The town of Bilar, Bohol celebrates its fiesta on May 15, to honor the town patron Saint Isidore the Farmer.

Geography

Barangays
Bilar comprises 19 barangays:

Climate

Demographics

Economy

Tourism

 Bilar Man-made Mahogany Forest
 Bilar Rice Terraces
 Bohol Biodiversity Center
 Habitat Butterflies Conservation Center
 San Isidro Labrador Parish Church
 Bilar Hill Park
 Logarita Falls
 Tinugdan Spring
 Pangas Falls

Gallery

References

External links

 [ Philippine Standard Geographic Code]
 Bilar
 Historical Landmarks, Places of Interest, and Things to Do in the Philippines
Municipality of Bilar
Nature Spots of the Philippines

Municipalities of Bohol